Uwe Steingross (born 19 April 1951) is a German sailor who competed in the 1976 Summer Olympics and 1980 Summer Olympics.

References

1951 births
Living people
Sportspeople from Berlin
German male sailors (sport)
Olympic sailors of East Germany
Sailors at the 1976 Summer Olympics – Flying Dutchman
Sailors at the 1980 Summer Olympics – Tornado
European Champions Soling